In the realm of Internet marketing, autosurfs are traffic exchanges that automatically rotate advertised websites in one's web browser. Therefore, they are capable of bringing a large amount of traffic to the advertised websites. Members earn credits for each site that they view, which can then be spent to advertise members' sites by adding them to the autosurf rotation. Sites may additionally be added by external advertisers who pay the autosurf operators.

Concept

Autosurfing is an evolved form of traffic exchanging, based on the manual surf traffic exchange concept. In 2001, Autohits.dk was the first ever autosurf traffic exchange to use a PHP script that eliminated the need for viewers to manually click a link or image to advance to the next page in the rotation. Traffic exchanges are based on a simple concept: members of a traffic exchange view each other's sites in order to earn credits. Those credits are applied for views in the rotation. The purpose of autosurf traffic exchanges is to increase website traffic.

Traffic exchanges have been in existence since the internet became mainstream. They were first used in business-to-business applications, with companies exchanging pageviews of their websites between employees. Autosurf traffic exchanges were created for trading pageviews automatically without any manual effort on the surfer's part. They are advertising outlets that have been around for many years and continue to prosper. Some members prefer to be advertisers, and they pay for credits and/or upgraded memberships, which go towards pageviews, in lieu of surfing. Most autosurf exchanges are geared towards free members, since the free members' surfing is what drives the flow of traffic and pageviews.

Some autosurfers are paid to view pure advertising (that is, advertisers' websites) for a certain amount of time (usually, less than 30 seconds.) Interested viewers can pause the surf timer or open any site in a new window, giving themselves more time to peruse an ad. If the viewer is not interested and does nothing, the surf timer will reset and the rotation will advance to the next page in the queue after the specified period of time.

Autosurfing allows members to promote websites of their own choice, according to a system of credits earned by surfing. Members earn credits with a surf ratio predetermined by the autosurf site's owner. In other words, each page a member views is worth a certain part or whole credit, and each view of a member's site costs credits (e.g. 2:1 Surf Ratio means a member earns 1 view of their site for every 2 pages they view.) Member can promote their own websites/pages as well as affiliate programs. Many autosurf sites offer incentives for members to recruit new members, such as bonuses and a percentage of the credits each referral makes. This is because traffic exchanges need new members to continually replace those members lost to attrition. Also, getting new and unique viewers to join an autosurf site increases the site's value and performance. The more unique viewers an autosurf site has, the better the exchange typically performs.

As autosurfs are run from websites, online payment processors are used for members to upgrade and withdraw their profits. The most popular form of e-currency used is PayPal, Payza and Bitcoin. StormPay was a very popular payment processor until February 2006 but has now converted to an auction site.

"Investment" Autosurfs

A large number of autosurfs became investment autosurfs around 2005 and 2006: to earn money surfing, members must pay a fee and are then promised a certain return on their fee. The "investment" is claimed to be a membership or upgraded membership fee and the "return", a per-site commission.

In the case of investment autosurfs, members either pay a fee to join and/or to upgrade their account level. This fee can usually vary from a few cents to thousands of dollars, and the minimum and maximum is set by the site operator. The program then offers a commission based on the member's account level for viewing a minimum number of sites, for example, for a period of X days, every day that the member views Y sites, Z% of the upgrade fee will be credited and can be withdrawn from the site. The product of Z% and X is always over 100% to ensure that the member makes a profit. Members also have even more incentive to build a downline because further commissions are received based on the amount of money that referred members put in or earn.

The investment autosurf concept is against PayPal's Acceptable Use Policy. Historically, PayPal blocked most autosurf programs' accounts after the 12DailyPro incident. However, autosurf traffic exchanges that do not have investment options or pay members to surf were allowed to continue or resume using PayPal as a payment processor.

Controversy
A large amount of controversy is concentrated over whether autosurfs are inherently structured as Ponzi schemes. Traffic-only autosurfs that involve no monetary transactions can also be Ponzis if more credits are earned than page views available; older members are promised a certain number of website hits which can only be fulfilled by newer members joining. Due to the precedent set by 12 Daily, there is a strong possibility that most investment autosurfs are Ponzi schemes, and thus breaking the law and/or deceiving their users; whereas paid to surf sites usually had a viable business model where advertisers pay for the site to be viewed but not earn money in return.

On the other hand, autosurfs which require an investment and promise to pay a profit must, to not be a Ponzi, have other sources of income which can yield the high percentages they offer. Therefore, they often come under attack for failing to reveal their income sources or not registering with the proper authorities as a legitimate investment company. Ponzi schemes will end when no new investors are found, and it follows that autosurf sites have rather short life spans, existing from one week to a few years depending on the popularity and "investment plans" offered.

12DailyPro
12DailyPro, founded by Charis Johnson, was one of the largest autosurfs in 2005. Promising a return of 12% daily for 12 days, funds invested went into the millions. In February 2006, autosurfs reached the United States national news when funds of members of 12DailyPro were frozen by payment processor StormPay.

Rather than focus entirely on StormPay, news organizations such as ABC4 (Utah) and WTOC (Georgia) investigated the autosurf itself. In a statement released by the Georgia Government Consumer Protection Agency titled "Pyramid Schemes Never Die; Just Evolve", 12DailyPro was closely scrutinized. Media calls to 12DailyPro owner Charis Johnson went unanswered.

Later in February, 12DailyPro received a cease and desist order by the SEC, who claimed that 95% of the program's funds came from new members.  On February 28, the SEC filed a proposed stipulation, agreed to by the attorney for Charis Johnson, LifeClicks, and 12DailyPro that these parties would turn over all assets and records to a permanent legal receiver.

2006-Present 
After the demise of 12DailyPro, many other autosurfs collapsed as well; this is widely assumed to be because they invested member funds into 12DailyPro, causing a domino effect. Subsequently, autosurfs have become less popular and are more widely believed to be Ponzi schemes. However, many still autosurf, either refusing to accept that they are Ponzi structured, or knowingly using this to profit (through attracting new investors to prolong the life of the program). Also, some autosurfs have begun to focus on the advertising side of their business model, by, for example, converting to manual surf or by paying members bonuses that are not dependent upon the advertising fee. They have introduced disclaimers on their sites saying that purchases are solely for advertising, earnings are payments for viewing advertising and that there is no guarantee of earnings. However, disclaimers do not override the law and thus do not legalize an otherwise fraudulent program.

Money invested in 12DailyPro is currently being held by a court-ordered payment receiver.

References

External links
 ABC4 News in Utah Investigative video into 12DailyPro
 Current news from Thomas F. Lennon, a United States District Court-appointed Receiver for 12DailyPro
 “Auto-Surfing”: What You Need to Know from the U.S. Securities and Exchange Commission

Advertising
Traffic exchanges
2000s fads and trends